Tijion Esho is a British doctor known for aesthetic medicine and non-surgical procedures. He is the founder of the ESHO Clinic.  He is the resident cosmetic doctor on the E4 reality show Body Fixers.

Early and personal life
Esho was born and grew up in North London and is of Nigerian descent. During his youth he attended Edmonton County Secondary School, and initially wanted to become an artist but due to his conservative African up-bringing he was encouraged not to follow this career option. In 2000, Esho started his education at Leicester Medical School,  and graduated in 2005 with a Bachelor of Medicine (MBCHB). In 2007 he completed his foundation year and the following year Esho completed his MRCS, then after completing junior (core training) surgical rotation training, Esho moved to the vocational training scheme (General Practice training scheme).

Career
Esho started his career at the NHS as a surgical trainee, completing his junior training before training as a GP, and shortly after that he founded the Le Beau Ideal Lifestyle Clinic and then in 2013 "rebranded" to The ESHO clinic with locations in London and Newcastle upon Tyne.   In early 2016, Esho launched Midas By Esho,  a lip augmentation tool to help practitioners sculpt and position lips whilst making augmentations. Apart from the development of Midas, Esho has been involved in pioneering new techniques and methods in laser skin rejuvenation, lip augmentation with the Nano Droplet technique, Cupid’s Bow Lift and leading a Botox revolution with Robot Botox. In autumn 2017, Esho launched the ESHO product range in collaboration with Brandon Truaxe's beauty company Deciem. He has also advocated for stricter UK legislation when it comes to safety protocols for cosmetic surgery.

In 2018 Esho coined the phrase "Snapchat dysmorphia" - the phenomenon of people requesting procedures to resemble their digital image.

Television
In 2016, Esho was cast as the resident cosmetic doctor on E4’s reality show Body Fixers (a spin off of E4's other show Tattoo Fixers). Body Fixers was produced by Studio Lambert and first aired in September 2016; in February 2017, it was announced that the show would run for a second season. Prior to Body Fixers, Esho had made guest appearances on Channel 4’s Bodyshockers.

ESHO Initiative
In October 2016, Esho, in collaboration with Church Pharmacy and Cosmetronic, launched the ESHO Initiative, a charity clinic which provides corrective treatment to patients with botched cosmetic procedures, congenital deformities, or severe scarring or disfigurement.

Awards and recognition
Good Surgeon Guide, Best Cosmetic Doctor (2014/2015)
4T Medical, Avant Garde Award for achievement in Aesthetics (2015)
 Safety in Beauty Awards, Highly commended doctor of the year (2016)
 Best clinic NE 2018 Award, Cosmetic Clinic of the Year 
 Listed in the Ultimate 100 Global practitioner list for aesthetics - MyFaceMyBody Awards

External links
Esho Clinic website

References

1981 births
Living people
Medical doctors from London
Cosmetic surgery in the United Kingdom
English people of Nigerian descent
Alumni of the University of Leicester
People educated at Edmonton County School